George Edgar Hughes (24 February 1870 – 6 October 1947) was an English rugby union footballer who played in the 1890s. He played at representative level for England, and at club level for Barrow, as a forward, e.g. front row, lock, or back row. Prior to April 1897, Barrow was a rugby union club.

Background
George Hughes was born in Otley, West Riding of Yorkshire, and he died aged 77 in Walney-in-Barrow, Lancashire.

Playing career

International honours
George Hughes won a cap for England while at Barrow in 1896 against Scotland.

Change of Code
When Barrow converted from the rugby union code to the rugby league code in April 1897, George Hughes would have been 27 years of age. Consequently, he may have been both a rugby union and rugby league footballer for Barrow.

References

External links
Search for "Hughes" at rugbyleagueproject.org
Search for "George Edgar Hughes" at britishnewspaperarchive.co.uk
Search for "George Hughes" at britishnewspaperarchive.co.uk
Search for "Edgar Hughes" at britishnewspaperarchive.co.uk

1870 births
1947 deaths
Barrow Raiders players
England international rugby union players
English rugby league players
English rugby union players
People from Otley
Rugby league players from Leeds
Rugby union forwards
Rugby union players from Leeds